Tipapan Leenasen (born 9 September 1943) is a Thai athlete. She competed in the women's high jump at the 1964 Summer Olympics.

References

1943 births
Living people
Athletes (track and field) at the 1964 Summer Olympics
Tipapan Leenasen
Tipapan Leenasen
Place of birth missing (living people)